The Department of War Studies (DWS) is an academic department in the School of Security Studies within the Faculty of Social Science & Public Policy at King's College London in London, United Kingdom. Along with other politics and international studies units at King's College London, it ranks amongst the top places for international relations in the world. The department is devoted to the multi-disciplinary study of war and diplomacy within the broad remit of international relations.

The department's alumni includes senior government officials, military personnel, diplomats, journalists, academics and businesspeople. Amongst them are former Prime Minister of Jordan Marouf al-Bakhit; Special Representative of the UN Secretary-General for Iraq Nickolay Mladenov, the Dutch Minister for Foreign Trade and Development Cooperation Tom de Bruijn and former Commandant General Royal Marines Sir Robert Fry.  The department is affiliated with numerous think-tanks and foreign policy institutions. It also houses numerous research institutes and centres, including the Liddell Hart Centre for Military Archives.

Since 2019, the Head of Department has been Michael Goodman. The Department of War Studies is located on the 6th floor of the King's Building on the Strand Campus of King's College London.

History 
A Department of Military Science existed at King's College London from 1848 to 1859. Military Science was subsequently approved as a subject for the Bachelor of Arts and Bachelor of Science general degrees from 1913, and was taught under the Faculty of Arts and also the Faculty of Engineering.

In 1926 the intervention of William Norton Medlicott prevented the Department of History from ridding itself of the lectureship in Military History. With War Office support the Military Studies Department was established in 1926 and formed part of the Faculty of Arts, with Major General Sir Frederick Barton Maurice holding the Chair. It became known as the War Studies Department in 1943 but was discontinued in 1948, although the subject continued to be taught under the Department of Medieval and Modern History.

Following World War II, there was an initiative by senior members of University of London notably Lionel Robbins, Sir Charles Webster and Keith Hancock, to revive Military Studies at the University. In 1953, Sir Michael Howard was appointed to the Lectureship in Military Studies, and by 1962 Sir Michael was able to reinstate the Department of War Studies to offer postgraduate courses.

A Bachelor of Arts degree in War Studies was offered from 1992 onwards. The department became part of the School of Humanities in 1989 and the School of Social Science and Public Policy in 2001.

In 2012 the department celebrated its 50th anniversary, with a series of celebratory events to mark the occasion.

Notable alumni and students

Government and politics

Marouf al-Bakhit (PhD 1990), former Prime Minister of Jordan
Martin Bourke (MA 1970), former Governor of the Turks and Caicos Islands
Tom de Bruijn (MA 1974), Dutch Minister for Foreign Trade and Development Cooperation
Eoghan Murphy (MA 2005), former Irish Minister for Housing, Planning and Local Government.
Tan Chuan-Jin (MA 1999), Speaker of the Parliament of Singapore
Kayode Fayemi (PhD 1987), Nigerian Governor
Mark Francois (MA 1987), Conservative Member of UK Parliament
John Freeman (PhD 1984) Governor of the Turks and Caicos Islands
Christopher Geidt, Baron Geidt (MA 1987),  Crossbench peer
Natalia Gherman (MA 1999), former Acting Prime Minister of Moldova
John Hillen (MA 1993), former US Assistant Secretary of State for Political-Military Affairs
Dan Jarvis (MA 2011), Labour Member of UK Parliament
Imran Ahmad Khan (BA, 1996), Conservative Member of UK Parliament
Nickolay Mladenov (MA 1996), UN Special Coordinator for the Middle East Peace Process
Jiří Šedivý (MA 1994), Director of European Defence Agency, former Permanent Representative of the Czech Republic to NATO
Keith Simpson (postgraduate research 1972), former Conservative Member of Parliament
Pritam Singh (MA 2004), Singaporean Opposition Leader
Shaun Spiers (MA 1985), former Labour Member of the European Parliament
Eleni Stavrou (MA; PhD), Member of the Cyprus House of Representatives

Military, security and diplomacy
 

A.T.M. Zahirul Alam (MA 1993), former Force Commander of United Nations Mission in Liberia
Sir Adrian Bradshaw (MA 2005), former Deputy Supreme Allied Commander Europe and former UK Commander of Land Forces
Paul Crespo (MA 1990), former US Marine captain, risk analyst and activist
Peter Drissell (MA 1994), former Commandant-General of the RAF Regiment
Richard A. Falkenrath (PhD 1993), former Deputy Commissioner for Counterterrorism at NYPD
Sir Robert Fry (MA 1987), former Commandant General Royal Marines
Sir Wira Gardiner (MA 1980), New Zealander public servant
Judith Gough (MA 2012), British Ambassador to Sweden
Syed Ata Hasnain (MA 2006), former Military Secretary of the Indian Army
Md Hashim bin Hussein (MA 1991), former Chief of the Malaysian Army
Ola Ibrahim (MA 2002),  former Chief of the Defence Staff of the Nigerian Armed Forces
Martin Kimani (MA 2003, PhD 2010),  Kenya's Permanent Representative to the United Nations 
Ahmad Massoud (BA, 2015), President of the National Resistance Front of Afghanistan
Sir Simon Mayall (MA 2003), former British Deputy Chief of the Defence Staff
Sir Tim Radford (MA), Deputy Supreme Allied Commander Europe
Maroof Raza (MA), Indian strategic affairs analyst
Ayesha Siddiqa (PhD 1996), Pakistani military scientist
Stuart Skeates (MA 1999), British Standing Joint Force Commander
Frank A. Rose (MA 1999), US Assistant Secretary of State for Arms Control, Verification, and Compliance
Nawaf Obaid (MA 2011, PhD 2013), political scientist and former Saudi foreign policy advisor
Petr Pavel (MA 2006), former Chief of General Staff of the Czech Army and former Chairman of NATO Military Committee

Academia, media and business
Ali Ansari (MA 1990), Professor of History at the University of St Andrews
Ruaridh Arrow (BA 2001), Senior producer BBC Newsnight, writer and film-maker
Abdul Razak Baginda, (MA 1984), Malaysian political analyst
Brian Bond (MA 1962), Military historian
Ahron Bregman (PhD 1994), British-Israeli political scientist
Paula Broadwell (PhD Student), biographer of General David Petraeus
Matthew Bryden (PhD Student), Canadian political activist
Youri Cormier (PhD 2014), author, professor Royal Military College of Canada, director Conference of Defence Associations (est. 1932)
Gwynne Dyer (PhD 1973), journalist
Andrew Exum (PhD 2010), Middle East Scholar
Daniel Ford (MA 2010), author
Ian Gooderson (MA PhD), Naval historian
Andrew Gordon (PhD 1983), Naval historian
Eric Grove (MA 1971), British Naval historian
Rosemary Hollis (MA 1975) British political scientist
Sam Instone (BA 1998), Founder and current Chief Executive of AES International
Andrew Lambert (MA PhD), Military historian
Michael A. Levi (PhD 2006), CFR Senior Fellow
Sophie Long (BA 1997), BBC News presenter
Diana Magnay (MA 2016), journalist
Peter R. Neumann (PhD 2002), Terrorism expert
Peter Paret (PhD 1960), Military historian
Tom Rogan (BA 2008), journalist
Philip Sabin (PhD 1984), Military historian
Yezid Sayigh (PhD 1987), Middle East scholar
Gary Sheffield (PhD 1994), Military historian
David Stahel (MA 2000), historian
Nicholas Stuart (MA 1984), journalist
Geoffrey Till (PhD 1976), Maritime historian
Alexander Windsor, Earl of Ulster (BA 1996), Director of Transnational Crisis Project
Kieran West (MA 2005), Olympic gold medal-winning rower
Colin White (MA 1975), former Director of the Royal Naval Museum

Past and present faculty 

James M. Acton
Robert J. Art
Mats Berdal
John Bew
Didier Bigo
Philip Bobbitt
Brian Bond
Ahron Bregman
Bill Durodié
Nicholas Eftimiades
Joel Hayward
Michael Howard
Vivienne Jabri
Ashley Jackson
Mark Laity
Andrew Lambert
Lawrence Freedman
Thomas Gomart
Barry M. Gough
Beatrice Heuser
Richard Ned Lebow
Anatol Lieven
Colin J. McInnes
Anand Menon
John Nagl
Peter R. Neumann
David Omand
Richard Overy
Friedbert Pflüger
Jonathon Riley
Andrew Roberts
Philip Sabin
John Sawers
Yezid Sayigh
Nigel Sheinwald
Jack Spence
Julian Thompson
Cedric Thornberry
Guglielmo Verdirame
Kenneth Waltz
Simon Wessely
Ken Young
Peter Zimmerman

Tolstoy Cup 

The Tolstoy Cup is an annual football match played between the students of the Department of War Studies at King's and the Department of Peace Studies at the University of Bradford since 1995. The rivalry between 'Peace Studies' and 'War Studies' was featured on the Financial Times list of "Great college sports rivalries". The competition is named after War and Peace, the 1869 novel written by the Russian author Leo Tolstoy. The "trophy" is a framed copy of the book. It is kept by the department of the current winners.

References

External links

 Official website of the Department of War Studies

Departments of King's College London
Military education and training in the United Kingdom
1962 establishments in the United Kingdom
Schools of international relations